Dur Naheen Manzil is a 1973 Bollywood drama film. The film stars Pradeep Kumar and Sanjeev Kumar.

Songs
"Ajeeb Zindagi Hai Ye" - Mohammed Rafi
"Bezubaan Dil Shor Na Macha" (Happy) - Suman Kalyanpur
"Aise Lagi Jaise Koi Mithi Agan" - Mahendra Kapoor
"No No Aisa Na Karo" - Sharda
"Liye Chal Gaddiya" - Suman Kalyanpur

External links
 

1973 films
1970s Hindi-language films
1973 drama films
Films scored by Shankar–Jaikishan